Olivia Eileen Baker (born 28 February 1979 in Upper Hutt, New Zealand) is a former weightlifting competitor for New Zealand.

At the 2002 Commonwealth Games in Manchester she won a silver medal in the 75+ kg snatch, and two bronze medals in the 75+ kg clean and jerk and combined total.

References

Living people
1979 births
New Zealand female weightlifters
Commonwealth Games silver medallists for New Zealand
Commonwealth Games bronze medallists for New Zealand
Weightlifters at the 2002 Commonwealth Games
Olympic weightlifters of New Zealand
Weightlifters at the 2000 Summer Olympics
Commonwealth Games medallists in weightlifting
20th-century New Zealand women
21st-century New Zealand women
Medallists at the 2002 Commonwealth Games